The Himalayan beautiful rosefinch (Carpodacus pulcherrimus) is a true finch species (family Fringillidae). It is found in mid-western China and the northern Himalayas. Its natural habitats are temperate shrubland and subtropical or tropical high-altitude shrubland.

References

Himalayan beautiful rosefinch
Birds of Bhutan
Birds of China
Birds of the Himalayas
Birds of Tibet
Himalayan beautiful rosefinch
Taxonomy articles created by Polbot